Helminthoglypta nickliniana, common name "Nicklin's Peninsula snail" or "Coast Range shoulderband" is a species of air-breathing land snail, a terrestrial pulmonate gastropod mollusk in the family Helminthoglyptidae.

This snail is endemic to the United States.

Description
This species creates and uses love darts as part of its mating behavior.

References

Molluscs of the United States
Helminthoglypta
Gastropods described in 1838